Dorycricus ruater is a species of tephritid or fruit flies in the genus Dorycricus of the family Tephritidae.

Distribution
Kenya.

References

Tephritinae
Insects described in 1947
Diptera of Africa